A health shake is a blended beverage intended to be healthful for one to consume and some are commercially marketed for that purpose. They are often consumed by sportspeople as part of a fitness diet or as a meal replacement (e.g., an instant breakfast). They have also been targeted towards those who have nutritional deficiencies as well as those working in tech fields. Health shakes may include a wide range of ingredients, including powdered nutrients, superfoods, bee pollen, peanut butter, coconut oil, bean powder, clover sprouts, whey, etc.

Bodybuilders sometimes drink a protein shake to help muscular recovery and building. While some health shakes have more calories than a plate of pancakes or a cheese omelet, these extra calories are accompanied by nutrients and both may be required by athletes in training. Smoothies—particularly green smoothies—are arguably a type of health shake, except stereotypical health shakes often contain some processed ingredients rather than just raw fruit and vegetables. Factory-made products often contain sweeteners and other additives (e.g., antioxidants, preservatives).

See also

 Health food
 Green smoothie
 Juice bar
 Slim-Fast
 Ensure
 Soylent

References

External links

 
 Natural Shake at Healthprons

Non-alcoholic drinks
Articles containing video clips